The 1896 Ole Miss Rebels football team represented the University of Mississippi as an independent during the 1896 college football season. Led by John W. Hollister in his first and only season as head coach, Ole Miss compiled a record of 1–2.

Schedule

References

Ole Miss
Ole Miss Rebels football seasons
Ole Miss Rebels football